Yashikey (Yäşekäy) is a rural locality (a village) in Safarovsky Selsoviet, Chishminsky District, Bashkortostan, Russia. The population was 8 as of 2010. There is 1 street.

Geography 
Yashikey is located 23 km southwest of Chishmy (the district's administrative centre) by road. Karamaly is the nearest rural locality.

References 

Rural localities in Chishminsky District